Pervomayskaya Peak is a peak, 2,795 m, standing 1 nautical mile (1.9 km) northeast of Mount Skarshovden in the central Humboldt Mountains, Queen Maud Land. Discovered and plotted from air photos by German Antarctic Expedition, 1938–39. Mapped from air photos and surveys by Norwegian Antarctic Expedition, 1956–60; remapped by Soviet Antarctic Expedition, 1960–61, and named Gora Pervomayskaya (May 1 Mountain).

Humboldt Mountains (Antarctica)
Mountains of Queen Maud Land